Petra Holubová (born 12 October 1968) is a Czech former professional tennis player.

Holubová, who reached a career-high ranking of 132 in the world, competed in the qualifying draw for the 1992 US Open.

Her best performances on the WTA Tour were round of 16 appearances at the Belgian Open and Palermo in 1992.

ITF finals

Singles: 7 (3–4)

Doubles: 16 (9–7)

References

External links
 
 

1968 births
Living people
Czechoslovak female tennis players
Czech female tennis players